The NBL1 West presented 18 award categories (9 for the Men and 9 for the Women) to recognise its players and coaches for their accomplishments in the 2022 season. Between 1989 and 2019, the league was known as the State Basketball League (SBL).

Traditionally, there were three main regular season awards given in the Men's and Women's competitions during the SBL era: Most Valuable Player, Coach of the Year and Most Improved Player/Rookie of the Year. There was also All-Star Five and All-Defensive Five.

In 2021, four main regular season awards were given for the first NBL1 West season: Most Valuable Player, Coach of the Year, Defensive Player of the Year and Youth Player of the Year. There was also Leading Scorer, Leading Rebounder, Golden Hands and All-NBL1 West First Team. In 2022, the league included Sixth Man/Woman of the Year for the first time.

The only individual award of the postseason is the Grand Final MVP. Between 1989 and 2019, there were perpetual trophies given to the champions of both competitions. These were discontinued in 2021.

Honours

Individual awards

References

NBL1

State Basketball League lists
Lists of sports awards